Albanians number up to 12.000 people in the Netherlands. The vast majority emigrated from Kosovo and North Macedonia.

Demographics

There is no exact answer to the number of ethnic Albanians in Netherlands. According to the Diaspora Ministry of the Republic of Albania, Netherlands has one of the best conditions for the Albanian diaspora. According to the Kosovo-Albanian Diaspora Ministry, there are about 60,000 ethnic Albanians living in the Netherlands. It is estimated that 20,000 Kosovo Albanians have emigrated to the Netherlands since the 1999 Kosovo war.

Notable people

Arts and entertainment
 Alban Ramosaj – Dutch singer, songwriter, record producer and model

Sport
 Rezar – Dutch professional wrestler 
 Albian Muzaqi – Dutch professional footballer 
 Shkodran Metaj – Dutch footballer
 Destan Bajselmani – Dutch footballer
 Arian Kastrati – Dutch footballer

See also  
Albania–Netherlands relations
Immigration to the Netherlands
Albanian diaspora
Albanians in Belgium

References 

 

Ethnic groups in the Netherlands
Immigration to the Netherlands 
Netherlands
 
  
Albania–Netherlands relations
Kosovo–Netherlands relations